Hector McDonald "Max" Nicolson (12 October 1917 – 31 May 1997) was an Australian rules footballer who played with Geelong in the Victorian Football League (VFL).

Nicolson served in the Australian Army during World War II.

Notes

External links 

1917 births
1997 deaths
Australian rules footballers from Victoria (Australia)
Geelong Football Club players